Ali Demirboğa (born August 2, 1990) is a Turkish figure skater. He is a five-time (2010–2014) Turkish national champion.

Programs

Competitive highlights 
CS: Challenger Series; JGP: Junior Grand Prix

References

External links 

 
 Ali Demirboga at Tracings

1990 births
Turkish male single skaters
Living people
Sportspeople from İzmit
Competitors at the 2015 Winter Universiade
Competitors at the 2011 Winter Universiade
Competitors at the 2013 Winter Universiade
20th-century Turkish people
21st-century Turkish people